Dave Collings was a college football player. Collings was a running back and punter for the Georgia Bulldogs, a part of its "ten second backfield" in 1920. He made a 40-yard drop kick against South Carolina. In the 7–0 defeat of Furman, a punting duel between Collings and Milton McManaway featured throughout. He started the game against Vanderbilt in 1922 at quarterback.

References

American football halfbacks
Georgia Bulldogs football players
American football drop kickers